Polkovnik (Colonel) Vladimir Platonovitch Liakhov (also spelled Liakhoff) (c. 20 June 1869 – June 1919) was the commander of the Persian Cossack Brigade during the rule of Mohammad Ali Shah Qajar. He gained considerable notoriety after shelling the Majlis of Iran and execution of several constitutionalist leaders on June 23, 1908. As a sign of gratitude, Mohammad Ali Shah appointed him as the Military Governor of Tehran.

Liakhoff and his forces subsequently served the Shah until July 1909. Upon the Shah's abdication and escape to Russia, Liakhov surrendered the Persian Cossack Brigade. However, Liakhov was pardoned by the constitutionalist leaders, as is speculated, for fear of Russian retribution, was sent back to Saint Petersburg.

He then served at the Caucasian Front during World War I. In 1916, Lyakhov's troops captured Trabzon in the Trebizond Campaign.After the Russian Revolution, Lyakhov joined the White movement, serving in the Denikin's Volunteer Army. In October 1918, he led the attack against the Vladikavkaz Railway. Since November 15, 1918, he was the commander of the III Army Corps of the Volunteer Army. After the occupation of the Terek on January 10, 1919, he was appointed commander-in-chief of the troops in the Terek-Dagestan Territory. After April 1919, he was moved in the reserve of the Volunteer Army, retired from military service  and settled in the suburb of Batumi. There, he was killed by intruders in unclear circumstances.

Notes

External links
 Three short biographies of Liakhov 

1869 births
1919 deaths
Cossacks from the Russian Empire
People of the Persian Constitutional Revolution
Russian military personnel
Russian military personnel of World War I
Politicians of the Russian Empire
White movement people
Emigrants from the Russian Empire to Iran
White Russian emigrants to Iran